Thorvald Hagedorn-Olsen (1 June 1902 – 20 January 1996) was a Danish painter. His work was part of the painting event in the art competition at the 1936 Summer Olympics.

References

1902 births
1996 deaths
20th-century Danish painters
Danish male painters
Olympic competitors in art competitions
People from Svendborg
20th-century Danish male artists